Ornithosuchus (meaning "bird crocodile") is an extinct genus of pseudosuchians from the Late Triassic (Carnian) Lossiemouth Sandstone of Scotland. It was originally thought to be the ancestor to the carnosaurian dinosaurs (such as Allosaurus). However, it is now known to be more closely related to crocodilians than to dinosaurs.

Description
 
Despite this relationship to crocodiles, Ornithosuchus was able to walk on its hind legs, like many dinosaurs. However, it probably spent most of its time on all fours, only moving bipedally when it needed to run rapidly. Its skull also resembled those of theropod dinosaurs, but more primitive features included the presence of five toes on each foot and a double row of armoured plates along the animal's back.

Classification 

A single species of Ornithosuchus is recognized, O. woodwardi. Ornithosuchus taylori is a synonym.

"Dasygnathus" longidens was in 1877 created by Thomas Huxley for a right maxilla from the Lossiemouth Sandstone found in 1857. The genus name Dasygnathus had already been used for a coleopteran insect, so Huxley's generic name was in 1961 changed to Dasygnathoides. Although synonymized with Ornithosuchus by Walker (1964), a 2016 study found Dasygnathoides indeterminate beyond Pseudosuchia. The maximal length of Ornithosuchus was revised to 2.2 metres.

Ornithosuchus is the type genus of the Ornithosuchidae, a family of facultatively biped carnivores that were geographically widespread during the Late Triassic. Two other genera are currently known, Venaticosuchus and Riojasuchus.

References

Sources
 Walker, A.D. (1964). "Triassic reptiles from the Elgin area: Ornithosuchus and the origin of carnosaurs". Philosophical Transactions of the Royal Society of London. Series B, Biological Sciences, 248(744): 53-134.

Ornithosuchids
Triassic archosaurs
Late Triassic reptiles of Europe
Fossils of Scotland
Prehistoric pseudosuchian genera